Zofia Albinowska-Minkiewiczowa (November 16, 1886 – June 30, 1971) was a Polish-Ukrainian artist, painter and engraver tied to the Lvov circle of artists. For many years she was president of the General Union of Polish Artists. After Lvov was annexed by the Soviet Union, Albinowska-Minkiewiczowa joined the Union of Soviet Artists of Ukraine. She signed her paintings with her maiden name, Zofia Albinowska.

Biography

Albinowska-Minkiewiczowa was born in Klagenfurt, Duchy of Carinthia, Austria-Hungary. During 1906–1912 she studied in Paris in Académie Colarossi and École des Beaux Arts. Studying in Paris she was in close relationship with Olga Boznańska and received many artistic leads from her. During this period she traveled to France, England, Belgium, Netherlands, and Italy.

From 1909–1912 Albinowska studied at the k. k. Kunstgewerbeschule in Vienna. After graduating, she returned to Lvov permanently, where she remained for the rest of her life. At this time Lvov, then known as Lemburg, belonged to Austrian Galicia, which was later ceded to independent Poland and the Ukrainian SSR. In 1922 she married , professor of architecture in Lvov and Wrocław.

For many years between World War I and World War II, Zofia Albinowska-Minkiewiczowa was the president of the General Union of Polish Artists. She participated in many domestic and international exhibitions, including in Prague, Paris, and New York.

Her early works are usually portraits, but after 1920 she painted mainly small compositions showing room interiors, still life and flowers. Her works are sometimes described as being painted in a post-impressionist manner. She refused to paint the Soviet commanders saying that she can paint only the flowers.

She died in Lvov in 1971.

Selected paintings
 Kwiaty na oknie (Flowers in the Window), 1912
 Kwiaty w dwóch wazonach (Flowers in Two Vases)
 Bukiet kwiatów (Bouquet of Flowers)
 Bukiet róż z winogronami (Rose Bouquet With Grapes)
 Martwa natura z kwiatami (Still Life With Flowers)
 Wnętrze saloniku (Parlor Interior)
 Martwa natura (Still Life)
 Róże (Roses)
 Martwa natura z hiacyntem i porcelanowym wschodnim talerzem (Still Life With Hyacinth and Porcelain Eastern Plate)

External links 
 Desa Dziela Sztuki i Antyki - auction results of October 2000
 Dom Aukcyjny Ostoya - March 2001 auction results with Albinowska paintings
 Dom Aukcyjny Ostoya - September 2001 auction results with Albinowska paintings
 Polski Dom Aukcyjny Sztuka - Auction results of December 2001
 Desa Dziela Sztuki i Antyki - auction results of March 2005
 Parorama Art gallery - auction results

1886 births
1971 deaths
Artists from Klagenfurt
People from the Duchy of Carinthia
20th-century engravers
20th-century Polish painters
Polish engravers
Académie Colarossi alumni